Dalneye Chesnochnoye is a rural locality (a selo) in Alexeyevsky District, Belgorod Oblast, Russia. The population was 131 as of 2010. There are 7 streets.

Geography 
Dalneye Chesnochnoye is located 12 km northeast of Alexeyevka (the district's administrative centre) by road. Blizhneye Chesnochnoye is the nearest rural locality.

References 

Rural localities in Alexeyevsky District, Belgorod Oblast
Biryuchensky Uyezd